Long Lake (New York) may mean:
 Long Lake (Hamilton County, New York), a lake in Hamilton County
 Long Lake (Oneida County, New York), a lake on Oneida County
 Long Lake (Fine, St. Lawrence County, New York), a lake in St. Lawrence County
 Long Lake (Pitcairn, St. Lawrence County, New York), a lake in St. Lawrence County
 Long Lake, New York, a town in Hamilton County
 Long Lake CDP, New York, a census designated place in Hamilton County